Mark Beyer may refer to:

 Mark Beyer (comics) (born 1950), American comics artist
 Mark Beyer (novelist) (born 1963), American novelist and journalist